Isaak Tirion (1705 in Utrecht – 1765 in Amsterdam) was an 18th-century publisher from the Northern Netherlands.

Biography
According to the RKD, he is most remembered for his Hedendaagsche historie (Modern History) and his Vaderlandse Historie, both historical reference works that were illustrated with engravings by leading artists of Amsterdam.

References

External links
 
 Isaak Tirion on Artnet
 "Map of the Whole of Guiana or the Savage Coast, and the Spanish West Indies at the Northern End of South America" by Isaak Tirion

1705 births
1765 deaths
Dutch male writers
Businesspeople from Utrecht (city)
Dutch publishers (people)